Paraglyphesis is a genus of Asian dwarf spiders that was first described by K. Y. Eskov in 1991.

Species
 it contains three species:
Paraglyphesis lasiargoides Eskov, 1991 – Russia
Paraglyphesis monticola Eskov, 1991 – Russia
Paraglyphesis polaris Eskov, 1991 (type) – Russia

See also
 List of Linyphiidae species (I–P)

References

Araneomorphae genera
Linyphiidae
Spiders of Russia